Chizhikov (from чижик meaning siskin) is a Russian masculine surname, its feminine counterpart is Chizhikova. It may refer to
Aleksei Chizhikov (born 1969), Russian football player
Rodislav Chizhikov (1929–2010), Russian cyclist
Victor Chizhikov (1935–2020), Russian children's book illustrator

See also
Chizhov

Russian-language surnames